Giacomo da Campli (circa 1420 - died 1490s)  was an Italian painter, active in the province of Teramo.

Biography
He was born in Campli and is documented as active from 1461 to 1479.

References

15th-century births
15th-century deaths
People from Campli
15th-century Italian painters
Italian male painters
Italian still life painters